Laois was a parliamentary constituency represented in Dáil Éireann, the lower house of the Irish parliament or Oireachtas, from 2016 to 2020. The constituency elected 3 deputies (Teachtaí Dála, commonly known as TDs). The method of election was proportional representation by means of the single transferable vote (PR-STV).

History and boundaries
The Constituency Commission proposed in its 2012 report that at the 2016 general election a new constituency called Laois be created. The report proposed changes to the constituencies of Ireland to reduce the total number of TDs from 166 to 158.

It was established by the Electoral (Amendment) (Dáil Constituencies) Act 2013. The constituency incorporated all of County Laois from the previous Laois–Offaly constituency, and six electoral divisions from Kildare South.

The 2013 Act defined the constituency as:

"The county of Laois;

and in the county of Kildare the electoral divisions of:
Ballybrackan, Churchtown, Harristown, Kilberry, Kildangan, Monasterevin, in the former Rural District of Athy No. 1."

It was abolished at the 2020 general election, along with the Offaly constituency. They were replaced by a re-created Laois–Offaly constituency.

TDs

2016 general election

See also
Dáil constituencies
Politics of the Republic of Ireland
Historic Dáil constituencies
Elections in the Republic of Ireland

References

Dáil constituencies in the Republic of Ireland (historic)
Historic constituencies in County Laois
2016 establishments in Ireland
Constituencies established in 2016
2020 disestablishments in Ireland
Constituencies disestablished in 2020